The Wynne Theater was a movie theater on 54th and Wynnefield Avenue in the Wynnefield neighborhood of Philadelphia, Pennsylvania, United States. Considered to be a Philadelphia "Landmark," it was originally built from 1927 to 1928 by Hoffman-Henon Co. for the Stanley Company of America (later Stanley Warner Theaters). The theater was named for Thomas Wynne, the attending physician of William Penn. It showed second run films and double features and could seat 1,663 people. In 1955 the theater closed and was taken over by the Uhr family of South Philadelphia. The building was renovated and renamed the Wynne Cateres where it became a popular place for parties and hosting.

The last owner of the property died in 1993 and with no one left to claim the space, the building has remained unoccupied. In 2008 the Community Design Collaborative awarded a service grant to the Wynnefield Overbrook Revitalization Corporation (WORC) to be put towards the creation of plans for the redevelopment of the Wynne Theater complex. A report completed in 2010 presented several options, with community members favoring the property's conversion into a community center. This would see the unsafe and damaged areas of theater replaced, as well as the restoration of the historic headhouse, to create a large community hall above ground level parking. The project's total cost was estimated at $6.7 million but as of January 2012 no work has been initiated and a developer has yet to be found to carry out the proposal.

In December 2011, the Provenance Architectural Salvage in Philadelphia removed and sold the building's neon art deco letters, and lighting fixtures from the outside of the building, owing to concern by the Department of License and Inspections that these were a safety hazard. The marquee letters were made from enameled steel and produced locally in nearby Lansdale.

References

External links
Photograph of the Theater's exterior

Cinemas and movie theaters in Pennsylvania
Theatres in Philadelphia
Theatres completed in 1928
Historic buildings and structures in the United States
West Philadelphia
1928 establishments in Pennsylvania